The 4th Minnesota Infantry Regiment was a Minnesota USV infantry regiment that served in the Union Army during the American Civil War. It served in several important campaigns in the Western Theater.

Service
The 4th Minnesota Infantry Regiment was mustered into Federal service by companies at Fort Snelling, Minnesota, between October 4 and December 23, 1861, and moved to Benton Barracks, St. Louis, Missouri, on April 23, 1862.

The 4th Minnesota Infantry participated in Maj. Gen. Henry Wager Halleck's advance on and Siege of Corinth, Mississippi, from May 18 to May 30, 1862.  The regiment participated in Ulysses S. Grant's Central Mississippi Campaign from November 1862 to January 1863.  Participation in Grant's Vicksburg Campaign followed, with the 4th Minnesota fighting in the Battle of Port Gibson on May 1, 1863, the Battle of Raymond on May 12, the Battle of Jackson on May 14, the Battle of Champion's Hill May 16, the Battle of Big Black River on May 17 and the Siege of Vicksburg from May 18 to July 4, 1863.  The regiment performed garrison duty at Vicksburg  followed the surrender, remaining at that location until September 12, 1863.

The regiment participated in the Third Battle of Chattanooga from November 23–27 1863, then was on garrison duty at Bridgeport and Huntsville in Alabama, until June 1864, having Veteranized during the spring of 1864.  It participated in Sherman's March to the Sea from November 15 to December 10, 1864, finishing the war during the Carolinas Campaign  from January to April 1865 and then participated in the Grand Review of the Armies on May 24, 1865.

The 4th Minnesota Infantry was mustered out on July 19, 1865, and was discharged from service at St. Paul, Minnesota, on August 7, 1865.

Casualties
The 4th Minnesota Infantry suffered 3.             officers and 58 enlisted men killed in action or who later died of their wounds, plus another 3 officers and 175 enlisted men who died of disease, for a total of 239 fatalities.

Commanders
 Colonel John B. Sanborn - January 1, 1862, to August 4, 1863
 Colonel John Eaton Tourtellotte - October 5, 1864, to June 21, 1865

References

External links
 The Civil War Archive
 Minnesota Historical Society resources on Minnesota and the Civil War
MNopedia article on the 4th Volunteer Infantry

See also
 List of Minnesota Civil War Units

Units and formations of the Union Army from Minnesota
1861 establishments in Minnesota
Military units and formations established in 1861
Military units and formations disestablished in 1865